Stade Général Aboubacar Sangoulé Lamizana is a multi-use stadium in Bobo Dioulasso, Burkina Faso, used mostly for football matches. The stadium hosted several matches during the 1998 Africa Cup of Nations. The stadium holds 30,000 people.

References

Football venues in Burkina Faso
ASF Bobo Dioulasso